Leonard Harvey Nitz (born September 30, 1956) is a retired track cyclist from the United States. He won the silver medal in the 4000m team pursuit and bronze in the 4000m individual pursuit at the 1984 Summer Olympics in Los Angeles, California.  Nitz was the bronze medalist in the Amateur Points Race at the 1986 UCI Track Cycling World Championships in Colorado Springs, Colorado.

References

External links
 
 databaseOlympics

1956 births
Living people
American track cyclists
American male cyclists
Cyclists at the 1976 Summer Olympics
Cyclists at the 1984 Summer Olympics
Cyclists at the 1988 Summer Olympics
Cyclists at the 1987 Pan American Games
Olympic silver medalists for the United States in cycling
Olympic bronze medalists for the United States in cycling
Medalists at the 1984 Summer Olympics
Pan American Games bronze medalists for the United States
Pan American Games medalists in cycling
Sportspeople from Hamilton, Ohio
Medalists at the 1987 Pan American Games